Leppington is a suburb of Sydney, in the state of New South Wales, Australia. Leppington is located 38 kilometres south-west of the Sydney central business district, in the local government areas of the City of Liverpool and Camden Council.

History
The area now known as Leppington was originally home to the Darug people. It was named after a property called Leppington Park granted to William Cordeaux in 1821. Cordeaux used convict labor to build a two-storey mansion and to work in his fields. The house burnt down in the 1940s but some of the bricks from the house were re-used at Leppington Public School.

The suburb could easily have been named Raby. The first land grant in what is now Leppington was made to Alexander Riley in 1810, who named his property Raby. The property was subdivided in 1914 and a school established in 1923, called Raby Public School. Leppington Post Office opened on 12 February 1924.

In 1955 the name of the school was changed to Leppington Public School, possibly inspired by the bricks they inherited from William Cordeaux's mansion. The suburb has been known as Leppington since then. Ironically, Raby Road which connected the property to Campbelltown would later lend itself to the suburb of Raby.

In 2004, Leppington was identified as part of Sydney's South West Growth Centre.

Leppington was the birthplace of convicted Sydney murderer, kidnapper and drug dealer Anthony Perish.

The Australia Day Ambassador for Leppington is Brett Hinch.

Population
At the 2016 census, the suburb of Leppington recorded a population of 3,498 people. 60.2% of people were born in Australia. The next most common countries of birth were China 3.3%, Italy 3.0% and India 2.9%. 53.7% of people spoke only English at home. Other languages spoken at home included Arabic 6.8%, Cantonese 5.1% and Italian 4.7%. The most common responses for religion were Catholic 36.3%, No Religion 15.0% and Anglican 10.5%.

Transport
Camden Valley Way connects Leppington to Camden and Liverpool as well as the Westlink M7, a pay road providing relatively quick connection to Sydney CBD and other parts of greater Sydney. Leppington railway station on the South West Rail Link has frequent direct services to the CBD via Strathfield.  Construction began in mid-2010 and opened 8 February 2015. See Leppington railway station for details of local bus services.

Politics
The bulk of Leppington belongs to the north ward of Camden Council while the northwest part of the suburb sits within the City of Liverpool. The suburb is contained within the federal electorate of Werriwa, represented by Anne Stanley (politician) (Labor), and the state electorate of Camden, currently held by Peter Sidgreaves (Liberal).

References

External links
Liverpool City Council

Suburbs of Sydney
City of Liverpool (New South Wales)
Camden Council (New South Wales)